SS Benlomond was a British merchant ship torpedoed in the South Atlantic by a German U-boat in 1942. Built in 1922 as Cynthiana, over the next two decades she passed through a number of owners and had several different names; Hoosac (1922), London Corporation (1922-1937), Marionga J. Goulandris  (1937-1938) and finally Benlomond from 1938 to 1942.

Construction and early career
Benlomond was built by Irvine's Shipbuilding & Dry Docks Co. Ltd., West Hartlepool and completed in January 1922 as Cynthiana for Furness, Withy & Co. Ltd. She was soon renamed, taking the name Hoosac in February 1922, and then London Corporation in November 1922. In 1925 Furness, Withy & Company transferred her to one of their subsidiary lines, Warren Line (Liverpool) Ltd., before she was transferred back to the parent company in 1929. In December 1937, they sold her to the Greek shipping firm Goulandris Brothers, of Andros, who renamed her Marionga J. Goulandris but in May 1938 she was sold back into British ownership, being bought by Ben Line Steamers Ltd., Leith and renamed Benlomond. She was the fourth ship of Ben Line Steamers to be named Benlomond. Benrinnes, bought by Ben Line in November 1938, was the sistership of Benlomond, having been built by Irvine's Shipbuilding and Dry Docks Company in 1921 as the Parisiana for Furness, Withy & Company.

Loss
Benlomonds final voyage took her from Port Said to New York, via Cape Town and Paramaribo, under the command of her master, John Maul.  On 23 November 1942, she was sailing unescorted and in ballast to Paramaribo when she was spotted by the German submarine U-172, under the command of Carl Emmermann. At 14.10 hours U-172 fired two torpedoes which hit Benlomond, sinking her within two minutes about 750 miles east of the River Amazon. After questioning the survivors, U-172 left the area. Ultimately only a single survivor of the sinking, Chinese second mess steward Poon Lim, survived to be rescued after spending 133 days on a Carley float. He was picked up by a Brazilian fishing vessel east of Salinas, and was landed at Belém on 8 April 1943. The rest of the Benlomonds crew, her master, 44 crew members and eight gunners, were lost.

References

1922 ships
Ships built on the River Tees
Maritime incidents in November 1942
Ships sunk by German submarines in World War II
World War II shipwrecks in the South Atlantic
World War II merchant ships of the United Kingdom
Cargo ships of Greece
Merchant ships of the United Kingdom